The GRSE-class survey vessels are a series of four survey vessels planned to be built by Garden Reach Shipbuilders and Engineers (GRSE), Kolkata for the Indian Navy. The first vessel is expected to be commissioned by 2021. The primary role of the vessels would be to conduct coastal and deep-water hydro-graphic survey of ports, navigational channels, Economic Exclusive Zones and collection of oceanographic data for defence. Their secondary role would be to perform search & rescue, ocean research and function as hospital ships for casualties.

History 
In April 2016, the Indian Navy issued a request for proposal to six shipyards, four public and two private, for the construction of four large survey vessels. In September 2017, GRSE emerged as the lowest bidder with a bid of ₹2,435.15 crore, beating L&T Shipbuilding by ₹742 crore. The contract was awarded to GRSE by Ministry of Defence on 30 October 2018. The first ship is expected to be delivered within 36 months from the date of signing the contract.

Design 
The ships have a complement of 231 and are equipped with hydrographic sensor equipment and a hangar which can accommodate one advanced light helicopter. In the secondary role, the ships can be fitted with a CRN 91 naval gun. In addition, the vessels will follow MARPOL (marine pollution) Standards of the International Maritime Organisation and will be built per Classification Society Rules and Naval Ship Regulations.

Development 
The keel of the first ship Sandhayak ,named after its predecessor , was laid down on 8 November 2019 and launched on 5 December 2021. It is expected to be commissioned by 2023.

The second vessel of the class, Nirdeshak , was laid on 1 December 2020 and was subsequently launched on 26 May 2022.

The third ship, Ikshak, was laid down on 6 August 2021 and launched on 26 November 2022.

Ships of the class

See also 

 Future of the Indian Navy

References 

Survey ships of the Indian Navy
Auxiliary research ship classes